Skerdian Perja (born 3 March 1991 in Kavajë) is an Albanian footballer who currently plays as a defender for KF Besa Kavajë in the Albanian First Division.

References

1991 births
Living people
Footballers from Kavajë
Albanian footballers
Association football defenders
Besa Kavajë players
Kategoria Superiore players
Kategoria e Parë players